Roman Faber (born 16 December 1955) is a Polish footballer. He played in two matches for the Poland national football team in 1979.

References

External links

 

1955 births
Living people
Polish footballers
Poland international footballers
Sportspeople from Wrocław
Association football midfielders
Śląsk Wrocław players
Wiener Sport-Club players
FC Viktoria Köln players
Polish expatriate footballers
Expatriate footballers in Austria
Expatriate footballers in West Germany
Polish expatriate sportspeople in Austria
Polish expatriate sportspeople in West Germany